Paul A. Brown is an American academic, businessman, pathologist and writer.

Education
He attended Harvard College (1960), located in Cambridge, Massachusetts; and the Tufts University School of Medicine (1964), located in Boston, Massachusetts.

He underwent professional training in pathology at the Tufts-New England Medical Center (1964–65), also located Boston; and Columbia-Presbyterian Hospital (1965–69), located in New York City, New York.

Career
He served as the chief of pathology at Portsmouth Naval Hospital (1969–70), located in Portsmouth, Virginia.

Brown was a member of the Board of Trustees at Tufts University, the chairman of the Board of Overseers at Tufts University School of Medicine, part of the Visiting Committee at Boston University School of Medicine, and part of the Visiting Committee and instructor in pathology at the Columbia University College of Physicians and Surgeons.

In 1967, Brown founded MetPath, an American company providing clinical-laboratory services.  MetPath was acquired by Corning Glass Works for $140 million in 1982 and subsequently renamed to Quest Diagnostics (DGX).

He also founded HEARx in 1986, which was renamed to HearUSA and was acquired by Siemens AG for $130 million in 2011.

Brown co-wrote, with Richard D. Hoffmann, the 1998 book Success in the Business Jungle Secrets of an Entrepreneurial Animal (Pittsburgh, Pennsylvania: Dorrance Publishing).

See also

 List of Boston University people
 List of Columbia University people
 List of entrepreneurs
 List of Harvard University people
 List of pathologists
 List of Tufts University people

References

"Retired Doctor Hears Call to Return to Workplace" from The Miami Herald
"Doctor Hears Opportunity Knock Twice" from South Florida Sun-Sentinel
"CEO Interview: Paul Brown - HearUSA Inc (EAR)" from The Wall Street Transcript

Year of birth missing (living people)
Place of birth missing (living people)
20th-century American businesspeople
20th-century births
20th-century American educators
20th-century American physicians
20th-century American non-fiction writers
21st-century American businesspeople

21st-century American physicians
American business writers
American health care businesspeople
American company founders
American pathologists
Boston University staff
Businesspeople from Massachusetts
Businesspeople from New York City
Columbia Medical School faculty
Harvard College alumni
Living people
Physicians from Massachusetts
Physicians from New Hampshire
Physicians from New York (state)
Tufts University School of Medicine alumni
Writers from Boston
Writers from New Hampshire
Writers from New York City